Zeroth-order may refer to:

Zeroth-order approximation, a rough approximation
Zeroth-order logic, is first-order logic without variables or quantifiers

See also
 Zeroth (disambiguation)